ATV Offroad Fury is a 2001 racing video game developed by Rainbow Studios and published by Sony Computer Entertainment exclusively for the PlayStation 2 in North America and Europe.

A sequel, ATV Offroad Fury 2, was released in 2002.

Gameplay
The player may choose between 12 different types of all-terrain vehicles and race on 20 different free-roaming tracks in a variety of types, including Training, MAXXIS Nationals, Stadium Supercross, Freestyle Competitions, Cross Country Enduro, and Pro-Career, as well as various multiplayer modes. Each of the different game types have different objectives the player must accomplish in order to succeed. The player can perform stunts in Freestyle and it will award them with points.

Race modes
The game features three race "modes" that can be accessed through the track selection screen; Single Race, Lap Attack, and Practice. These cannot be selected during Pro-Career mode, and not all modes are available during certain events.

Reception

ATV Offroad Fury received "generally positive" reviews, according to review aggregator Metacritic. Jeff Lundgren of Next Generation said that "the game sports brilliant graphics, a (mostly) rock-solid framerate, intense tracks, a plethora of options, and excellent control".

By July 2006, the game had sold 1.7 million copies and earned $49 million in the United States. Next Generation ranked it as the 20th highest-selling game launched for the PlayStation 2, Xbox or GameCube between January 2000 and July 2006 in that country. Combined sales of ATV Offroad console games released in the 2000s reached 4.5 million units in the United States by July 2006.

References

External links

 
2001 video games
MX vs. ATV
PlayStation 2 games
PlayStation 2-only games
Sony Interactive Entertainment games
Multiplayer and single-player video games
Video games developed in the United States
Video games featuring protagonists of selectable gender
Rainbow Studios games